Toomelah is a 2011 Australian drama film written and directed by Ivan Sen and starring Daniel Connors, Christopher Edwards, and Michael Connors. It was shown at the 2011 Cannes Film Festival on 11 May in the Un Certain Regard program, where it received a two-minute long standing ovation. The film's story takes place in Toomelah Station, New South Wales.

Plot
Daniel is a ten-year-old boy living in Toomelah, NSW. After being suspended from school for threatening to stab a classmate with a pencil and finding there is little to do in his town, he decides he wants to be a part of the gang controlling the drug trade in his township, so he decides to help Linden, a well-known local drug dealer. Bruce, one of Linden's rivals, is released from prison and a turf war erupts. Meanwhile, Daniel faces problems at school and in his family, such as his mother's addictions, the estrangement of his alcoholic father and the return of his aunt who was forcibly removed from the mission as a child during the Stolen Generations.

Cast
Daniel Connors as Daniel
Christopher Edwards as Linden
Michael Connors as Buster
Dorothy Cubby
Dean Daley-Jones as Bruce
Alex Haines as Scammer
Linden Binge as Jarome
Aunty Sharon Binge
Aunty Margery Binge
Uncle Lloyd Hippi
Tyericq Jiko
Danieka Connors as Tanitia
Lauren McGrady
Kevin Binge

Production
When asked why he made a film about Toomelah, director Ivan Sen said:

Before filming, Sen obtained permission to film in Toomelah from the town's elders. Sen shot most of the scenes himself, as many of the actors in the movie are his personal friends and he believed their acting would be restricted if an entire conventional crew did the filming.

Awards

References

External links

2011 films
2011 drama films
Films set in New South Wales
Films about Aboriginal Australians
Australian drama films
Films directed by Ivan Sen
2010s English-language films